Dave Hunt is an English extreme metal vocalist. He is the vocalist of Anaal Nathrakh under the pseudonym V.I.T.R.I.O.L.,, a phrase found in alchemical literature which purports to be the origin of the name of vitriol. He was also the vocalist of Mistress under the pseudonym Dave Cunt until their split in March 2008.

Notably, Dave Hunt's lyrics for his main band, Anaal Nathrakh, are never released or published in album liner notes.  The one known exception is the song "Tod Huetet Uebel" from Passion, which was written as a collaboration with Rainer Landfermann, best known for his vocal work on the Bethlehem album Dictius Te Necare.

He lives in Birmingham, England.

As of late 2011, Hunt writes an online column for Terrorizer magazine entitled 'More of Fire than Blog', a play on an Anaal Nathrakh song/video title from the album In the Constellation of the Black Widow.

For most of the 2010s, Hunt was studying part-time towards a Ph.D. in Philosophy, in the area of Metaethics. His thesis advisor was Jussi Suikkanen, and he finished in March 2020.

Discography
With Anaal Nathrakh
 The Codex Necro (2001)
 When Fire Rains Down from the Sky, Mankind Will Reap as It Has Sown (2003)
 Domine Non Es Dignus (2004)
 Eschaton (2006)
 Hell Is Empty and All the Devils Are Here (2007)
 In the Constellation of the Black Widow (2009)
 Passion (2011)
 Vanitas (2012)
 Desideratum (2014)
 The Whole of the Law (2016)
 A New Kind of Horror (2018)
 Endarkenment (2020)

With Benediction
Organised Chaos (2001)
Killing Music (2008)

With Mistress
 Mistress (2002)
 Mistress II: The Chronovisor (2003)
 In Disgust We Trust (2005)
 The Glory Bitches of Doghead (2007)

With Dethroned
 Dethroned demo (1997)

References

People from Solihull
Year of birth missing (living people)
Living people
English heavy metal singers
Death metal musicians
Black metal musicians
English lyricists